Jaikesaram is a village in Nalgonda district in Telangana, India. It falls under Choutuppal mandal.

 India census this village has a population of 5051. In this village have been 11 wards.

References 

Villages in Nalgonda district